Nationality words link to articles with information on the nation's poetry or literature (for instance, Irish or France).

Events

Works published
 Nicholas Billingsley, Brachy-Martyrologia
 Henry Bold, Wit a Sporting in a Pleasant Grove of New Fancies
 William Davenant, Poems on Several Occasions
 Henry King, Poems, Elegies, Paradoxes, and Sonnets, published anonymously and in an unauthorized edition
 Joshua Poole, English Parnassus, an early handbook on poetry, with a preface signed "J. D.", apparently John Dryden

Births
Death years link to the corresponding "[year] in poetry" article:
 Arai Hakuseki (died 1725), Japanese poet, writer and politician
 John Norris (died 1712), English theologian, philosopher and poet
 Susanna Elizabeth Zeidler (died 1706), German poet
 Ebba Maria De la Gardie (died 1697), Swedish poet

Deaths
Birth years link to the corresponding "[year] in poetry" article:
 April ? – Richard Lovelace (born 1617), English Cavalier poet
 Johann George Moeresius (born 1598), Polish poet and rector

See also

 Poetry
 17th century in poetry
 17th century in literature

Notes

17th-century poetry
Poetry